The 2014 Saint Francis Cougars football team represented the University of Saint Francis, located in Fort Wayne, Indiana, in the 2014 NAIA football season. They were led by head coach Kevin Donley, who served his 17th year as the first and only head coach in the history of Saint Francis football.  The Cougars played their home games at Bishop John D'Arcy Stadium and were members of the Mid-States Football Association (MSFA) Mideast League (MEL). The Cougars finished 3rd in the MSFA MEL division and, for only the third time in the team's history, did not participate in the postseason NAIA playoffs.

Schedule 
(6-5 overall, 4-2 conference)

Ranking movements

References

Saint Francis
Saint Francis Cougars football seasons
Saint Francis Cougars football